The Nokia 6 is a Nokia-branded mid-range smartphone running on Android. It is the first smartphone from the Finnish company HMD Global, created through the partial divestment of Nokia's devices division; the first Nokia-branded smartphone since the Lumia 638; and the first Nokia-branded Android smartphone since the short-lived Nokia X2 in 2014. The phone was first announced for sale in China on January 8, 2017, with a global version announced the following month.

The successor to the Nokia 6, the Nokia 6.1, was announced on January 5, 2018 in China and on February 25, 2018 for other parts of the world.

Specifications

Hardware 
The Nokia 6 features a 16:9 5.5-inch Full HD display. It is powered by a Qualcomm Snapdragon 430 processor and has a micro-USB port. It has a 16-megapixel rear camera and an 8-megapixel front-facing camera with autofocus. The phone has either a single SIM slot or a hybrid SIM slot which can hold a Nano-SIM card and either a MicroSD card or another SIM card.

Software 
The Nokia 6 2017 version originally shipped with an unmodified version of Android 7.1.1 Nougat as opposed to modified versions which are used by most manufacturers; an update to Android 7.1.2 Nougat came out in October 2017. In late January 2018, the stable version of Android 8.0 Oreo was released for the Nokia 6. By March 28, 2018, the Android 8.1.0 Oreo Update came out with the March Security Patch. On February 21, 2019, the Nokia 6 received the Android 9 Pie update.

Release 
The Nokia 6 was first released in China on January 20, 2017, shortly after its announcement. Demand was high, and it was sold out within minutes after receiving over a million registrations. On February 26, 2017, at Mobile World Congress 2017, it was announced that Nokia 6 will be available globally. It was released in other Asian markets including Malaysia in May 30, 2017, and has been rolled out in Europe starting June 2017.

Reception 
The Nokia 6 generally received positive reviews. John McCann of TechRadar praised the phone’s camera, performance and affordability while criticising the “slow-to-charge” and uncomfortable design.

TrustedReviews praised the phone’s “solid battery life” and metal shell, while criticising the camera’s performance in low lighting and mixed lighting.

See also
 Microsoft Lumia 650

Notes

References

External links
 

6
Mobile phones introduced in 2017
Discontinued smartphones